Smeg is an Italian home appliance manufacturer.

History
Founded in 1948 by Vittorio Bertazzoni as an enameling and metalworking company, the Smeg company preserves the memory of the activity originally carried out in the acronym Smalterie Metallurgiche Emiliane Guastalla ("Emilian Metallurgical Enamelling Works Guastalla").

During the 1950s the company’s metalworking background was accompanied by the production of its first cooking appliances. In 1956, the company presented "Elisabeth", one of the first gas cookers equipped with automatic ignition,  a safety valve in the oven and a cooking programmer.

In the 1960s, Smeg introduced its first ever washing machine, the Leda, and then introduced the 60 cm Niagara dishwasher, known for its unprecedented load capacity of 14 place settings.

In 1971 the company began the production of built-in hobs and ovens.

Other activities
Having started in the residential sector, Smeg later entered the commercial market. Smeg Food Service manufactures appliances for the hotel, restaurant and catering market and Smeg Instruments supplies disinfection equipment to hospitals and dental surgeries.

Business
The design and manufacture of Smeg appliances is concentrated in four factories based in Northern Italy, each specialising in a specific type of appliance. Smeg has subsidiaries worldwide, overseas offices and an extensive sales network.
Smeg has developed a product collection in collaboration with architects and designers, including Guido Canali (who also designed the company headquarters in Guastalla), Mario Bellini, Renzo Piano, Marc Newson and deepdesign.

FAB retro-style appliances

In 1997, Smeg released their retro-style refrigerators. Produced in several colours, the FAB28 bore the distinctive SMEG lettering, deep curved doors and a chunky handle evocative of the 1950s.

Fridge-freezer versions followed and colour options expanded to include pink, yellow, orange and lime plus special editions, including a Union Jack door. 

In 2014, Smeg extended the FAB 50s style range further, with a collection of small domestic appliances such as toasters and kettles.

Awards
 2010: Good Design Award granted by the Chicago Athenaeum, Museum of Architecture and Design and the European Centre for Architecture, Art, Design and Urban Studies, for their FP610SG oven and the P755SBL hob from the innovative Newson product line.

See also

List of Italian companies

References

Home appliance brands
Home appliance manufacturers of Italy
Electronics companies established in 1948
Italian companies established in 1948
Italian brands
Guastalla
Companies based in the Province of Reggio Emilia